Pollyanna Chu (Chu Yuet Wah) is a billionaire businesswoman from Hong Kong. She is an executive of Kingston Financial Group, Golden Resorts Group, and Sincere Watch. As of 30 January 2018, Chu's estimated worth was US$10.2 billion, making her the 14th richest person in Hong Kong.

Early life
In 1958 Chu was born as Yuet Wah Lee in British Hong Kong. Her father was Wai Man Lee. She grew up in Aberdeen, Hong Kong.

Education
Pollyanna Chu moved to the United States at the age of 18. She holds a bachelor's degree in Management from Golden Gate University and awarded an Honorary Ph.D. in Business Management by York University, United States.

Personal life
She married her husband, Nicholas who she met while studying in San Francisco. She has one child named Kingston, who was born in San Francisco, but raised in Hong Kong. In Nov 2015, her son Kingston celebrated his wedding with Kelly Lo in Hong Kong.

In December 2021, it was reported that Chu had a "privileged" vote in the 2021 Hong Kong legislative election, where the vote would count approximately 7,215 times more than an ordinary citizen.

Career

Pollyanna and her husband Nicholas Chu became real estate investors on her father's recommendation and moved to Hong Kong in 1992 to pursue the business.

Kingston Financial Group Limited
Following success in California real estate, they founded Kingston Financial in 1992. The company was named after their son. Chu served as Managing Director, but co-ran Kingston Financial with her husband. The company initially focused on IPO distribution and mergers and acquisitions, finding particular success in 2010 as a top five firm in the latter pursuit.

As of 2016, Chu is the CEO and Executive Director of Kingston Financial Group Limited. As of 2016, she is the biggest shareholder and CEO of Kingston Financial. According to Bloomberg's League Tables, in 2016, Kingston Financial  is ranked the 1st as the leading Placing Agent and Underwriter in Hong Kong with 47 issues. The Group is also ranked the 3rd M&A Financial Adviser in Hong Kong with 22 deals.

Securities and Futures Commission
In 1997 she was "fined...for working as an unregistered dealer." Chu was accused of market manipulation in 2003 by the Securities and Futures Commission.

Golden Resorts Group
Chu is the CEO of the Golden Resorts Group Limited. It is engaged in the hotel and gaming business, notably Casa Real Hotel and Grandview Hotel in Macau.

Sincere Watch Limited
In 2012, she bought a 100% stake in Sincere Watch Limited, which is currently run by her son, Kingston Chu.

In May 2012, Chu became the executive director of Sincere Watch (Hong Kong) Limited and Director of Sincere Watch Limited. In July 2012, she became the Chairman of Sincere Watch (Hong Kong) Limited.

In July, 2012, she was named chairwoman of Franck Muller's Asia-Pacific operations.

Organisation
Chief Executive Officer of Kingston Financial Group (1031.HK) 
Chairman of Sincere Watch (Hong Kong) Limited (444.HK)

Awards

Chu was given the "Outstanding Chinese Prize" in 2008. In 2012, Forbes Asia listed her as one of their "Women In The Mix", their #35 Power Woman of 2017, their #549 'Billionaire' of 2016, and their #16 out of 'Hong Kong's 50 Richest' in 2016.

References

Living people
Hong Kong billionaires
Hong Kong women in business
1958 births
Golden Gate University alumni
Female billionaires